Juan José Castillo Colindres (born 12 October 1980) is a Guatemalan football midfielder or forward who plays for local club CSD Municipal in the Guatemala's top division.

Club career
Castillo helped C.D. Jalapa reach their only Guatemalan championship by scoring two goals against Municipal in the 2009 Clausura final.

The next season, Municipal brought him on and won the 2009 Apertura title with Castillo on the bench in favor of Carlos Figueroa.

Castillo eventually won the starting spot in the 2010 Clausura. In the knockout stage, he scored two goals against USAC late when Municipal was down 3-0 in the first leg. Municipal went on to win 4-3 on aggregate with a 2-0 win at home.

He managed to score once in each leg of Municipal's 7-2 rout over Club Xelajú MC in the final, giving him his third consecutive title with two clubs.

External links
 Player profile - CSD Municipal

References

1980 births
Living people
Guatemalan footballers
Guatemala international footballers
C.S.D. Municipal players
Place of birth missing (living people)
Association football forwards
Association football midfielders